This is a list of buildings that are examples of Art Deco in Oceania:

Australia 

 Australian War Memorial, Campbell, Australian Capital Territory, 1941
 National Film and Sound Archive (formerly The Australian Institute of Anatomy),  Acton, Australian Capital Territory, 1931

New South Wales
source: 
 Colonial Mutual Life Building, Newcastle, 1940
 Hydro Majestic Hotel, Medlow Bath
 Leeton District Lands Office, Leeton, 1937
 Montreal Community Theatre, Tumut, 1930
 Roxy Community Theatre, Leeton, 1933
 Roxy Theatre and Peters Greek Cafe Complex, Bingara, 1936
 University House (Newcastle), (Emil Sodersten), Newcastle, 1939

Suburban Sydney 
 Albury Hotel, Darlinghurst
 Berlei House, Regent Street, Chippendale, 1922
 Bilyard House, Elizabeth Bay
 Caversham Court, Elizabeth Bay
 Charing Cross Hotel, Waverley
 Chatsbury Apartments, Elizabeth Bay
 Cherwood Apartments, Elizabeth Bay
 Enmore Theatre, Newtown, 1910, 1920
 Erskineville Town Hall, Erskineville, 1938
 Golden Barley Hotel, Enmore
 Holy Cross Church, Woollahra
 Light Brigade Hotel, Paddington
 Mahratta, Wahroonga, 1941
 Marlborough Hall, Elizabeth Bay
 Melrose Apartments, Elizabeth Bay
 Minerva Theatre, Potts Point, 1939
 Niterider Theatre Restaurant, Homebush
 North Annandale Hotel, Annandale
 The Oxley Apartments, Elizabeth Bay
 Park View, Potts Point
 Pembroke Hall, Elizabeth Bay
 Petersham Town Hall, Petersham, 1938
 Ritz Cinema, Randwick, 1937
 Robin Hood Hotel, Waverley
 Rockdale Town Hall, Rockdale, 1940
 Roxy Theatre, Parranatta, 1930
 Royal Court, Darlinghurst
 The Rutland Apartments, Darlinghurst
 Somerset Apartments, Elizabeth Bay
 St Peters Town Hall, Sydenham, 1927
 Surf Life Saving Club, Cronulla, 1940
 Tahoe Apartments, Elizabeth Bay
 Tea Gardens Hotel, Bondi Junction
 Trent Bridge, Potts Point
 Unicorn Hotel, Paddington
 United Cinemas, Collaroy
 Valhalla Cinema, Glebe
 Werrington Apartments, Potts Point
 Winston Apartments, Elizabeth Bay
 The Wroxton Apartments, Elizabeth Bay
 Wynchbury Apartments, Potts Point

Sydney 
 Adereham Hall, Sydney, 1934
 AFT House, Sydney, 1940
 AMA House, Sydney, Macquarie Street, Sydney, 1930
 Amalgamated Wireless Australia (AWA) Building, York Street, Sydney, 1939
 Anzac War Memorial, (Bruce Dellit), Sydney, 1934
 Archibald Fountain, Sydney, 1926
 Asbestos House, York Street, Sydney
 Australian Catholic Insurance Building, York Street, Sydney
 AWA Tower, Sydney, 1937–1939
 Belgenny Flats, Sydney 1938
 Birtley Towers, Sydney, 1934
 BMA House, (Fowell & McConnel), Sydney, 1930
 Byron Hall, Sydney, 1928
 Cahors, Sydney, 1940
 Canon House, Sydney, 1925 (Demolished 2008)
 Challis House, Martin Place, Sydney, 1906, 1936
 Charles Plaza, (Hennessey & Hennessey), Sydney, 1937
 City Mutual Life Assurance Building, Hunter Street, Sydney, 1936
 Civic Hotel, Sydney
 Claridge Apartments, Sydney, 1939
 Commonwealth Bank Building, Roseville, Sydney
 Commonwealth Trading Bank Building, Martin Place, Sydney, 1933
 Concord Repatriation Hospital, Concord, Sydney, 1942
 Crest Cinema, Granville, Sydney
 Delfin House, (Bruce Dellit), Sydney, 1940
 Department of Railways, Sydney, 1936
 Elizabeth House, Sydney, 1930
 Eltham, Elizabeth Bay, Sydney
 Footprints Westend Sydney, Sydney, 1929
 Franconia, Sydney, 1930
 Gowrie Gate, Potts Point, Sydney
 Grace Building (Sydney), Sydney, 1930
 Grand United Building, Sydney, 1938
 Greenland Centre, apartments, Sydney
 Hayden Orpheum, Cremorne, Sydney
 Huntingdon Apartments, Elizabeth Bay, Sydney
 James Hardie House, (Robertson & Marks), Sydney, 1931
 Kanimbla Hall, Sydney, 1935
 King George V Memorial Hospital, Missenden Road, Camperdown, Sydney, 1941
 Kingsley Hall, Sydney, 1931
 Kyle House, (Bruce Dellit), Sydney, 1931
 Macleay Regis, Sydney, 1936
 Meudon, Sydney, 1940
 MLC Building, (Bates, Smart and McCutcheon), Sydney, 1937
 Mont Clair, Darlinghurst, Sydney
 Museum of Contemporary Art Australia, Sydney
 North Sydney Olympic Pool, North Sydney, 1936
 Onslow Gardens, Sydney, 1938
 Overseas Union Bank, Sydney, 1937
 Pacific House, Sydney, 1936
 Pioneer House, Sydney, 1930
 QBE Building (Emil Sodersten), Sydney, 1940
 St Margaret's Hospital, Bourke Street, Surry Hills, Sydney, 1910
 State Theatre Building, Sydney, 1929
 Swaab House, Sydney, 1935
 Sydney Water Head Office, Bathurst Street, Sydney; 1939 under redevelopment as part of the Greenland Centre Sydney
 Tara Apartments, Sydney, 1939
 Transport House, Sydney, 1936
 Waterboard Building, Sydney, 1939
 Westchester, Sydney, 1938
 Westminster Hotel Sydney
 The Wroxton, Sydney
 Wychbury, Sydney, 1934
 Wynyard House, Sydney

Queensland 
 Avalon Theatre, St Lucia, Brisbane, 1923
 Bellevue Court, Clayfield, Brisbane
 Bulolo Flats, Fortitude Valley, Brisbane, Queensland, 1934
 Colonial Mutual Life Building, Brisbane, 1931
 Coronet Flats, New Farm, 1933
 Empire Theatre, Toowoomba, 1911, 1933
 Filma Flats, Dutton Park, Brisbane, Queensland, 1934
 Forgan Smith Building, University of Queensland, Brisbane
 Hotel Cecil, Southport, 1938
 Jubilee Bridge (Harding Frew), (Old), Innisfail, 1932
 Jubilee Bridge (New), Innisfail, 2011
 McWhirters Shopping Centre, Fortitude Valley, Brisbane, 1931
 Osbourne Hotel, Fortitude Valley, Brisbane, 1864, 1920s
 Paragon Theatre, Childers, Bundaberg Region, 1927
 Shell House, Brisbane, 1933
 Southport Town Hall, Southport, Gold Coast City, 1935
 Tattersalls Club (Queen Street facade and interiors), Brisbane, 1925–1949
 Warrina Cinemas, Townsville, 1973
 William Jolly Bridge, (Harding Frew), Brisbane, 1932

South Australia 
 Adelaide High School, West Terrace, Adelaide 1947-1948
 Adelaide Symphony Orchestra headquarters (Former West's Cinema), 91–93 Hindley Street, Adelaide 1939
 AMP Building, (former), 23 King William Street, Adelaide 1936
 Arab Steed Hotel, 241 Hutt Street, Adelaide
 Archives Pavilion, Adelaide Showgrounds, Goodwood Road, Wayville 1936
 Astor Hotel, 437 Pulteney Street, Adelaide
 Australian Institute of Marine Engineers, 22 Divett Street, Port Adelaide 1935
 Avant Garde Building, 66 Currie Street, Adelaide 1937
 Backpack Oz Building, 144 Wakefield Street, Adelaide
 Bank of Adelaide (Former), 10 Belvidere Road, Saddleworth 1939
 Bank SA Building, (McMichael and Harris), Adelaide, 1943
 Bank SA  Kiosk, Adelaide Showgrounds, Goodwood Road, Wayville 1936
 Bayview Hotel, Corner Forsyth & Farrell Street, Whyalla
 Beacon Lodge Apartments, 101 Moseley Street, Glenelg, 1937
 Beverley Residential House, 40 Anzac Highway, Everard Park 1938
 Bristol Court flats, 1 Bristol Street, Glenelg, 1940
 Bruceden Court Apartments, 2A Deepdeene Avenue, Westbourne Park 1941
 Campbelltown Community Centre, Newton Road, Campbelltown 1937
 Capri Theatre, Goodwood, Unley, 1941
 Car Park, 14 Moore Street, Adelaide
 City of West Torrens Council Chambers, 165 Sir Donald Bradman Drive, Hilton
 Clarkson Building, 136 St Vincent Street, 1938
 Commercial Premises, 226 Victoria Road, Largs Bay
 Commercial Premises, 233 Pulteney Street, Adelaide
 Commercial SA Building, 11 Bentham Street, Adelaide 1934
 Country Arts SA Building, McLaren Parade, Port Adelaide 1936
 Cranbrook Apartments, 179 Goodwood Road, Millswood
 Dalgety Woolstore Building, 35 Baker Street, Port Adelaide 1938
 Deepacre Apartments, 287 Melbourne Street, North Adelaide, 1942
 Duke of Leinster Building, 23 Payneham Road, College Park
 Education Development Centre (formerly Hindmarsh Town Hall), Hindmarsh, 1936
 Eleanor Harrald Building, Lot Fourteen, Frome Road, Adelaide, 1954-1955
 Everard Court Apartments, 46 Anzac Highway, Everard Park 1939
 Factory, 34 Manchester Street, Mile End South
 Felicitas Apartments, Wellington Square, North Adelaide
 Fire Station (former), 26 Gordon Street Glenelg, 1938
 Fletcher Jones Building, 35 Hindley Street, Adelaide 1939
 Former Coles Building, Rundle Mall/Charles Street, Adelaide 1939
 Gilbert Place Apartments, 31 and 33 Gilbert Place, Adelaide 1936
 Gladstone Building, 36 Waymouth Street, Adelaide 1938
 Glenelg Dry Cleaners, 37 Cliff Street, Glengowrie
 Globe Hotel, 138-144 St.Vincent Street, Port Adelaide, refaced around 1930
 Greenways Apartments, 41-45 King William Road, North Adelaide
 Haigh Mansions Apartments, Esplanade, Henley Beach
 Hampstead Hotel, 143 North East Road, Collinswood
 Harbors Board Building, 129 Lipson Street, Port Adelaide 1934
 Hartrotd Building,(former Dulux paint factory), 67 Lipson Street, Port Adelaide 1938-1940
 Hindmarsh Incinerator, (Walter Burley Griffin Incinerator), Burley Griffin Boulevard, Brompton 1935
 Hindmarsh Municipal Band Studio, Manton Street, Hindmarsh 1939
 Holdfast Bay Council Chambers Brighton 1937
 Hotel Royal, 180 Henley Beach Road, Torrensville
 Howie & Organ Engineering Pty Ltd (former Gibb & Miller Ltd Engineers), 290 Commercial Road, Port Adelaide
 Institute of Medical & Veterinary Science Building, Frome Road, Adelaide 1942
 International Hotel-Motel, 40 Ellen Street, Port Pirie
 Kia-Ora Apartments, 3 Victoria Street, Goodwood, 1941
 Kidman Entrance Gates, Adelaide Showgrounds, Rose Terrace, Wayville 1937
 Klemzig Pioneer Cemetery Gates, Klemzig, 1936
 Laubman and Pank Optometrists, & Gritti Palace 62 Gawler Place, Adelaide 1938
 Lights Buildings, Light Square, Adelaide
 Lloyd Wiggins & Co. Ltd (former). Auction Rooms, Penaluna Place, Adelaide
 Lobethal Centennial Hall, 36 Main Street, Lobethal, 1936
 Marion Council Chambers (former - now private residence), Sturt Road, Marion 1937
 Masonic Centre, Commercial Road, Port Adelaide 1928
 Mayfair Hotel (former Colonial Mutual Life Building), Corner of King William and Hindley Streets, Adelaide 1935-1936
 Minlaton Town Hall, 57 Main Street, Minlaton
 Mitcham Council Chambers, 131 Belair Road, Torrens Park, 1934
 Mobil Service Station, 132 Semaphore Road, Exeter
 Morea Apartments, Glenelg South 1939
 Myponga Hall, Hansen Street, Myponga, 1938
 National War Memorial, corner North Terrace and Kintore Avenue, Adelaide
 Oakbank Hotel, Main Street, Oakbank

 Pennsylvania Apartments, Glenelg South
 Piccadilly Cinema, O’Connell Street, North Adelaide, 1940
 Port Adelaide Council Chambers, Port Adelaide 1940
 Prince of Wales Hotel, 215 Port Road, Queenstown 1936
 Regal Theatre (formerly The Chelsea), Kensington Park, 1925
 Regal Theatre, 67-73A Murray Street, Gawler 1935
 Renmark Hotel, Murray Avenue, Renmark
 Residential Apartments, 16a Martens Street, Fullarton, 1941
 Residential House, 1 St. Michaels Road, Mitcham, 1937
 Residential House, 12 Westall Street, Flinders Park, 1955
 Residential House, 122 Grant Avenue, Toorak Gardens
 Residential House, 14 William Street, Glenelg East, 1937
 Residential House, 15 Victoria Avenue, Unley Park
 Residential House, 20 Oaklands Road, Somerton Park 1951
 Residential House, 3 Prospect Road, Prospect 1938
 Residential House, 307 Torrens Road, Croydon Park
 Residential House, 31 Broadway, Glenelg 1941
 Residential House, 33 Chelmsford Avenue, Millswood, 1935
 Residential House, 33 Pier Street Glenelg 1940
 Residential House, 373 Grange Road, Findon, 1953-1954
 Residential House, 4 Bickford Terrace, Somerton Park, 1939
 Residential House, 51 Main Street, Beverley, 1955-1956
 Residential House, 6-8 Allen Grove, Unley, 1940
 Residential House, 74 May Street, Woodville West, 1953-1954
 Residential House, 87 Torrens Road, Brompton, 1938
 Retten Apartments, Glenelg 1939
 Ridley Gates, Adelaide Showgrounds, Goodwood Road, Wayville 1933
 Risdon Hotel, 22 Moppett Road, Port Pirie West, 1938
 Rising Sun Pictures Building, 182 Pulteney Street, Adelaide
 Roxy Theatre, Anzac Highway, Everard Park 1937
 Rundle Buildings, Rundle Street East, Adelaide 1939
 S.D. Caputo & Sons Shop, 1 Main Road, Solomontown
 Sands and McDougall Building, 64 King William Street, 1934
 Seafarers Fools Café, 60B Broadway, Glenelg South
 Shandon Apartments, 88 Moseley Street, Glenelg 1940
 Shop (formerly Clarkson), 136 St Vincent Street, Port Adelaide, 1938
 Shop, 125 & 125A Military Road, Semaphore
 Shop, 32 Semaphore Rd, Semaphore, 1938
 Shop, 34 Semaphore Rd, Semaphore
 Shop, 744-746 Anzac Highway, Glenelg 1941
 Shop, 86-108 Glen Osmond Road, Parkside 1935
 Shop, 97 Jetty Road Glenelg 1939
 Shoreham Apartments, Glenelg 1938
 Soldiers Remembrance Hall (now BMG Art), 444 South Road, Marleston
 Star Theatres (former Theatre 62), 145 Sir Donald Bradman Drive, Hilton
 Stirling Flats, 2 Saltram Road, Glenelg, 1939
 Strathmerton, 53-55 Whyte Street, Glenelg South 1939
 Sussex Hotel, 68 Walkerville Terrace, Walkerville
 Synagogue, Synagogue Place, Adelaide, 1940
 Trevu Flats, 2 Torrens Square, Glenelg
 Tubemakers Building, Churchill Road, Kilburn 1939-1942
 Victa Cinemas, 37-41 Ocean Street, Victor Harbor
 Victoria Park Race Gates, Rose Park
 Vogue Theatre, Belair Road, Hawthorn
 Walter Burley Griffin Incinerator, West Thebarton Road, West Thebarton 1937
 West Linton Apartments, 55 Tarlton Street, Somerton Park, 1940
 West Thebarton Hotel, South Road, Thebarton
 Westpac Building, (former), 2-6 King William Street, 1942
 Windmill Hotel, Main North Road, Prospect
 Woodlands Apartments, Jeffcott Street, North Adelaide
 Woodville Hotel, Port Road, Woodville

Tasmania 
 Alfred Harrap Building, corner of Tamar and Cimitier Street, Launceston
 Commonwealth Bank Building, Hobart, Elizabeth Street, Hobart
 Deacons Corner, corner Lytton Street and Invermay Road, Invermay, Launceston
 Duncan House, Launceston
 former Government Printer, 2–4 Salamanca Place, Hobart
 former Hobart Mercury Building, Hobart, 1928
 Holmes Building, corner Brisbane and Charles Street, Launceston
 Holyman House, Launceston, 1936
 Hotel Charles (Old Launceston General Hospital), Launceston
 Hydro-Electric Commission Building, Davey Street, Hobart
 Legacy House, Launceston
 Lucks Corner, corner Patterson and George Street, Launceston
 Medibank House (Launceston Gas Company), St John Street, Launceston
 original Myer Building, Liverpool Street, Hobart (Destroyed in the fire 22 September 2007)
 Park Hotel, Invermay Road, Launceston
 Princess Theatre, Launceston
 Prudential Insurance Building, Elizabeth Street, Hobart
 Rapson Tyre Factory, west end of Gleadow Street, Invermay, Launceston
 Royal Hobart Hospital, Hobart
 Shepherds Bakery, corner Quadrant and St John Street, Launceston
 Star Theatre (Invermay, Tasmania), Invermay, 1937
 T&G Building, (A & K Henderson), Hobart, 1938
 former Tasmania Savings Bank, Invermay Road, Launceston

Victoria 
 189 (Frank Tate Building), University of Melbourne, 1940
 A.N.A. Building, Melbourne, 1939
 Alkira House, (James Wardrop (architect)), Melbourne, 1936
 Astor Theatre, St Kilda, 1936
 Australasian Catholic Assurance Building, 118–126 Queen Street, Melbourne, 1936
 Australian Natives' Association Building, 28–32 Elizabeth Street, Melbourne
 Beehive Building, (Joseph Plottel), Melbourne, 1935
 Buckley & Nunn, 310 Bourke Street, Melbourne, 1934
 Burnham Beeches (Australia), (Harry Norris), Melbourne, 1933
 Capitol Theatre, Swanston Street, Melbourne, 1924
 Carlow House, 289 Flinders Lane, Melbourne, 1938
 Cathedral Arcade, Melbourne, 1925
 Catholic Ladies College, Eltham
 Centenary Hall, 104–110 Exhibition Street, Melbourne, 1934
 Century Building, Melbourne, (Marcus Barlow), Melbourne, 1939
 Century House, 133 Swanston Street, Melbourne
 Coles Store No 12, 299–307 Bourke Street, Melbourne
 Commercial Union Chambers, 411 Collins Street, Melbourne
 Commonwealth Bank, 225 Bourke Street, MelbourneACA Building, Melbourne, 1936
 Commonwealth House, Melbourne, 1941
 Deva House, (Harry Norris), Melbourne, 1924
 Dovers Building, Melbourne, 1908, 1938
 Epworth Freemasons' Hospital, 166 Clarendon Street, East Melbourne, 1937
 Glamis Towers, Loch Street, St Kilda
 Greyhound Hotel, St Kilda
 Harry Winbush's house at corner of Fletcher and Nicholson Streets, Essendon 1930s
 Heidelberg Town Hall (the Centre Ivanhoe), Ivanhoe, 1937
 Her Majesty's Theatre (Interior), 199–227 Exhibition Street, Melbourne, 1886
 Holroyd court, St Kilda East, 1936
 Leviathan Building, Melbourne, 1913
 Lissadurn (Australia) Lissadurn, Toorak Road, South Yarra
 Mac.Robertson Girls' High School, 350 Kings Way, Albert Park, 1934
 Manchester Unity Building, (originally the Manchester Unity Independent Order of Oddfellows), 291 Swanston Street, Melbourne, 1932
 McPherson's Building, 546 Collins Street, Melbourne
 Melbourne Athenaeum Theatre, Melbourne, 1924
 Mercy Hospital, 159 Grey Street, East Melbourne, 1934
 Michael Tuck Stand, Glenferrie Oval, 1938
 Mitchell House (Melbourne, Victoria), (Harry Norris), Melbourne, 1937
 Myer Emporium, 314–336 Bourke Street, Melbourne, 1914
 National Theatre, St Kilda, 1928
 Newman College, University of Melbourne, Parkville, Melbourne, 1918
 Newspaper House (Manor Apartment Hotel), 247 Collins Street, Melbourne, 1931
 Palace Westgarth, Melbourne, 1920
 Palais Theatre, St Kilda, 1919, 1927
 Prince of Wales Hotel, St Kilda
 Quest East Melbourne Hotel, Melbourne
 Repatriation Commission Outpatient Clinic, Melbourne, 1937
 Rex Theatre, Charlton, 1938
 Richmond Town Hall, Richmond, 1890s, 1930s
 Rivoli Cinemas, 200 Camberwell Road, Melbourne, 1940
 Royal Hotel, Richmond, 1939
 Russell Street Police Headquarters, (Percy Edgar Everett), Melbourne, 1943
 Shrine of Remembrance, St Kilda Road, Melbourne, 1934
 Sun Theatre, Yarraville, 1938
 T & G Building, Geelong, Geelong, 1934
 Trustees Executors & Agency Company Building, 401 Collins Street, Melbourne
 Yule House, 309–311 Little Collins Street, Melbourne, 1932

Western Australia 
source:
 Astor Cinema, Mount Lawley, 1939
 Atlas Building, Perth, 1931
 Attunga Flats, Subiaco, 1937
 Bellevue Mansions, West Perth, late 1920s
 former Blue Room Cabaret, Northbridge, 1930
 Blue Waters, Como, 1954
 Cafe Taimo, Nedlands
 Camelot Cinemas, Mosman Park, 1939
 Carlton Hotel, East Perth, 1928
 Chisholm House, Dalkeith, 1939
 Claremont Council Offices, Claremont, 1935
 Co-Masonic Temple, Vincent, 1936
 Cottesloe Beach Hotel, Cottesloe, 1937
 Criterion Hotel (former Regatta Hotel Complex), Perth, 1937
 Cygnet Cinema, (William T. Leighton), Como, 1939
 Devon House, Perth, 1937
 Edith Dircksey Cowan Memorial, Perth, 1934
 First Church of Christ, Scientist, Perth, 1939
 Gledden Building, (Harold Boas), Perth, 1937
 Guildford Town Hall and Library, Guildford, 1937
 Harper's Buildings, Perth, 1937
 Immaculate Conception Catholic Parish, Fremantle, 1940
 Karrakatta Cemetery Columbarium, Karrakatta
 King Edward Memorial Hospital entrance, Subiaco, 1938
 Kylemore apartments, Dalkeith, 1937
 Lawson Apartments, (Reginald Summerhayes), Perth, 1937
 Lincoln Street Ventilation Stack, Highgate, 1935
 Lord Forrest Olympic Pool, Kalgoorlie, 1938
 Luna Leederville (formerly New Oxford Theatre), Leederville, 1927
 Mayfair Flats, West Perth, 1936
 Michelides Tobacco Factory, (Demolished 2014), Perth, 1922
 Motor House, Perth, 1937
 Mount Lawley Bowls Club, Mount Lawley, 1936
 Nedlands Park Masonic Hall, Crawley, 1935
 Nedlands Tennis Club, Nedlands, 1937
 P&O Building, Perth, 1930
 Perth City YHA (former St. John's Ambulance Building), Perth, 1939
 Piccadilly Theatre and Arcade,  (William T. Leighton), Perth, 1938
 Plaza Theatre, (William G. Bennett), Perth, 1937
 Raffles Hotel, (William G. Bennett), Perth, 1936
 Regal Theatre, Subiaco, 1938
 Sawyers Valley Tavern, Sawyers Valley, 1937
 Sir J.J. Talbot Hobbs Memorial, Perth, 1940
 South Fremantle Power Station, North Coogee, 1946
 St. Mary's Hall, South Perth, 1936
 Tivoli Hall (formerly Applecross District Hall), Applecross
 Walsh's Building, Perth, 1923
 Wembley Lifecare Physiotherapy (formerly Wembley Theatre and Gardens), Wembley, 1937
 West Australian Ballet Company Centre (former Royal West Australian Institute and Industrial School for the Blind), Marylands, 1937
 Windsor Cinema, Nedlands, 1937

Fiji 
 Government Buildings, Suva, Suva, Late 1930s
 Regal Cinema, Suva, Late 1920s
 LDS Temple Suva, Suva

New Zealand

Auckland
 ASB Auckland Savings Bank building, Ponsonby, Auckland
 Capitol Cinema, Balmoral, 1922
 Landmark House, Auckland, 1929
 Metropolis building, (Peddle Thorp), Auckland, 1999
 Scenic Circle Airedale Hotel, Auckland, 1940
 St. Peter's College, (Gummer and Ford), Auckland, 1939

Bay of Plenty
 Commercial Hotel, Waihi

Waikato

Hamilton 
 82 Grey Street, Hamilton East, 1932
 98 McFarlane Street, Hamilton East, 1939
 Casino (Lenscrete dome of former post office), 1940
 Fairfield Bridge, 1937
 Frankton Hotel 1929

Huntly
 Essex Arms (former Coal Mine Hotel), Huntly, 1930

Putāruru 
 Putāruru Hotel, Putāruru, 1952

Raglan 
 Raglan Town hall (municipal buildings), Raglan, 1928

Te Awamutu 

 Bus garage 1936

Hawke's Bay

Hastings
 Bank of New South Wales, Market Street, Hastings, 1933
 Carlsson House, Hastings, 1933
 CML Building, Hastings
 Cornwall Park Stone Bridges, Hastings, 1930s
 Focal Point Cinema Hastings, Hastings
 Hastings Clock Tower, Hastings, 1934
 Hastings Health Center, Hastings, 1931
 Hawke's Bay Electric Power Board Company, Hastings, 1937
 Holdens Building, Hastings, 1934
 Las Palmas, Hastings, 1935
 Westermans Building, Hastings, 1932

Napier
source:
 24A Hastings Street, Napier, 1933
 Abbotts Building, Napier, 1932
 , Napier, 1935
 Art Deco Centre (formerly the Central Fire Station), Napier, 1926, 1931
 Art Deco Masonic Hotel (W J Prowse), Napier, 1932
 Art Deco Trust (formerly the New Zealand Insurance building, Napier
 , Napier
 Bowman Building, Napier, 1933
 , Napier, 1931
 Charlies Art Deco Restaurant, Napier, mid-1930s
 Civic Centre, Napier, 1925
 , Napier, 1932
 , Napier, 1932
 Deco City Motor Lodge, Napier
 Earthquake Memorial, Park Island, Napier, 1932
 Halsbury Chambers, Napier, 1932
 , Napier, 1930
 , Napier, 1931
 Hildebrandt's menswear building, Napier, 1932
 Kidsons Building, Napier, 1932
 , Napier, 1931
 McLean Park Pumping Station, Napier, 1931
 Ministry of Works Building, Napier
 Morris Street Pumping Station, Napier, 1931
 MTG Hawke's Bay (formerly the Hawke's Bay Museum), Napier, 1936–37
 , Napier, 1938
 Munster Chambers, Napier, 1933
 Napier Antiques & Jewellery Centre (formerly the Ministry of Transport Building), Napier
 Napier Heritage Trust (former Napier Fire Brigade hall,) Napier
 The Napier Soundshell, Napier, 1935
 The National Tobacco Company Building, Ahuriri, 1933
 The New Napier Arch, Napier, 1930s
 The Norwich Union, Napier, 1932
 Parker's Chambers, Napier, 1932
 Provincial Hotel, Napier
 , Napier, 1932
 Richardsons Building, Ahuriri, 1932
 The Rose Irish Pub, Napier, 1932
 Scinde Building, Napier, 1932
 Self-Help Shoppers Fair building, Napier, 1933
 The Smith and Chambers Building, Napier, 1932
 , Napier, 1935
 The Taradale Hotel (Now McDonald's), Napier, 1931
 Tennyson Chambers, Napier, 1932
 Thorp's Building, Napier, 1932
 Waiapu Cathedral of Saint John the Evangelist, Napier, Napier, 1931

Manawatū-Whanganui
 Embassy 3 Cinema, Whanganui, Mid 1920s

Palmerston North 
 Ansett Tower (Former T & G Building), 16-22 Broadway Avenue 1938
 Regent Theatre, 53 Broadway Avenue 1930
 Broadway Chambers & Coronation Building, 88-92 Broadway Avenue 1936
 United Manawatu Lodge (now Aqaba), 186 Broadway Avenue 1931
 Palmerston North Police Station (Former), 351-361 Church Street 1939
 Ward Brothers Building, 213 Cuba Street 1935
 Coronation Hall, 801 Main Street 1911
 NZ Jersey Cattle Breeders Assn, 129-131 Rangitikei Street 1928
 Te Awe Awe Flats, 72 Te Awe Awe Street 1950
 Palmerston North City Library (former Dunedin Import Co store), 4-9 The Square 1928
 Strand Building, 31-35 The Square 1930
 Old Council Chambers, 47 The Square 1892, renovated 1945
 Ladies Rest Rooms, The Square 1936
 Arts faculties, Massey University 1931

Wellington
 AMP Building (Edmund Clere), Wellington, 1929
 Berhampore State Flats, Berhampore, Wellington, 1939
 Hotel St George, Wellington, 1930
Hotel Waterloo, 1937
 Mutual Life & Citizens Assurance Company Building (Mitchell and Mitchell), Wellington, 1940
 National War Memorial, Wellington, 1932
 former Post and Telegraph Building, Wellington, 1939
 Prudential Assurance Building (Hennessey & Hennessey), Wellington, 1934

Canterbury
Masonic Hotel, St. Andrews, Canterbury

Christchurch
Majestic Theatre, Christchurch (demolished 2014)
West Avon Flats, Christchurch

Otago

Dunedin
 Hercus Building, University of Otago Medical School, Dunedin, 1948
 Hocken Collections Library, University of Otago, Dunedin, 1910
 Law Courts Hotel, Dunedin
 Rialto Cinema, Dunedin
 Toitū Otago Settlers Museum transport wing (former NZR bus depot), Dunedin

Ranfurly
 Centennial Milk Bar (now the Rural Art Deco Gallery), Ranfurly, 1930s
 Ranfurly Auto Building, Ranfurly, 1950 (demolished 2011)
 Ranfurly Hotel, Ranfurly, mid-1930s

Southland

Nightcaps
 Town Hall, Nightcaps

Papua New Guinea 
 Papua New Guinea Banking Corporation Headquarters, Port Moresby, 1977
 Jacksons International Airport Terminal, Port Moresby 1959

See also 

 List of Art Deco architecture
 Art Deco topics
 Streamline Moderne architecture

References 

 
Art Deco